Roger Wilson Blanchard (September 11, 1909 - February 17, 1998) was an American bishop of the Episcopal Church. He was the church's Bishop of Southern Ohio from 1959 to 1970.

Early life and education
Blanchard was born on September 11, 1909, in Brockton, Massachusetts, the son of Charles Francis Blanchard and Grace Wilson. He was educated in the public schools of Brockton, and then at Boston University, from where he graduated with a Bachelor of Arts in 1932. He then enrolled at the Episcopal Theological Seminary in Cambridge, Massachusetts, and earned a Bachelor of Divinity in 1936. Blanchard married Patricia Alice Goodwillie on June 11, 1936, and together had three children. He was awarded a Doctor of Divinity by Lake Erie College and Kenyon College, respectively, in 1958.

Ordained ministry
Blanchard was ordained deacon in June, 1936, and priest in March 1937 by Bishop Henry Knox Sherrill of Massachusetts.  He served as curate at St Stephen's Church in Lynn, Massachusetts, from 1936 to 1938, and then as rector of St Peter's Church in Beverly, Massachusetts, from 1938 to 1943. In 1943, he became rector of Calvary Church in Columbia, Missouri, while in 1949, he became the executive secretary of the Division of College Work for the national church. In 1956, he became Dean of St John's Cathedral in Jacksonville, Florida, retaining the post till 1958.

Bishop
In 1958, Blanchard was elected Coadjutor Bishop of Southern Ohio and was consecrated at Christ Church, Cincinnati, on November 11, 1958, by the presiding bishop, Henry Knox Sherrill. He then succeeded as diocesan bishop in May 1959 and remained so until his retirement in 1970. He then served as an assisting bishop in the Diocese of Massachusetts.

Blanchard  died on February 17, 1998, following a long illness.

References

1909 births
1998 deaths
Boston University alumni
20th-century American Episcopalians
Episcopal bishops of Southern Ohio
20th-century American clergy